B and E is a census-designated place (CDP) in Starr County, Texas, United States. It is a new CDP formed from part of the La Puerta CDP prior to the 2010 census with a population of 518.

Geography
B and E is located at  (26.356531, -98.753675).

Education
It is in the Rio Grande City Grulla Independent School District (formerly Rio Grande City Consolidated Independent School District)

References

Census-designated places in Starr County, Texas
Census-designated places in Texas